Cugir Arms Factory is a Romanian state owned defence company that is one of the oldest defense companies of Romania. Cugir Arms Factory has a history that can be traced back to 1799 during the Austrian Empire. The steel manufacturing workshops were founded in Cugir, Romania which is one of the first metallurgical factories in Transylvania. Cugir Arms Factory now produces products compatible with NATO standards.

History
Facility expansion started in 1926 with construction of new production halls. Militarization of the plant began during wartime and was managed by modern weapons manufacturing specialists. During the cooperation period with Vickers Armstrong Ltd. of London artillery parts and assemblies were manufactured. Later Zbrojovka Brno of Czechoslovakia took over the factory which resulted redesigning the production for infantry weapons and ammunition. Hermann Göring took over the company’s shares in World War II.

Cugir produced the first Romanian-designed weapon 9mm caliber submachine gun, Parabellum, “Oriţa” type. SC Cugir Mechanical Plant SA was divided in 2004, SC Cugir Arms Factory SA, a subsidiary of the National Company ROMARM.

Production

The plant produced the Pistol Mitralieră model 1963/1965 (PM md. 63), and GP 75 AKM rifles Avtomat Kalashnikova Modernizirovanniy (AKM) series of Kalashnikov rifles based on the Russian AKM design of 1959.
The factory also produces the popular AK style weapon the WASR-series rifles semi-automatic only variant of the AKM rifle.

See also
Pistol Mitralieră model 1963/1965
WASR series rifles
ROMARM
PSL

References

 Map sources:

External links 

 S.C. UZINA MECANICA CUGIR S.A. - History (Archive)

Romania–Soviet Union relations
Firearm manufacturers of Romania
Defence companies of Romania
Companies of Alba County